Leninskaya Iskra is a rural locality in Vysoksky Selsoviet Rural Settlement, Medvensky District, Kursk Oblast, Russia. Population:

Geography 
The village is located on the Reut River (a left tributary of the Seym), 61 km from the Russia–Ukraine border, 33.5 km south-west of Kursk, 4 km west of the district center – the urban-type settlement Medvenka, 2.5 km from the selsoviet center – Vysokoye.

 Climate
Leninskaya Iskra has a warm-summer humid continental climate (Dfb in the Köppen climate classification).

Transport 
Leninskaya Iskra is located 6 km from the federal route  Crimea Highway (a part of the European route ), on the road of intermunicipal significance  (M2 "Crimea Highway" – Leninskaya Iskra – Vysokoye), 25.5 km from the nearest railway halt and passing loop 454 km (railway line Lgov I — Kursk).

The rural locality is situated 41 km from Kursk Vostochny Airport, 93 km from Belgorod International Airport and 225 km from Voronezh Peter the Great Airport.

References

Notes

Sources

Rural localities in Medvensky District